On 29 November 1917, an egg was thrown at the Australian Prime Minister Billy Hughes at the Warwick railway station, Queensland, during his campaign for the 1917 plebiscite on conscription. The egg was thrown by Patrick Michael Brosnan, possibly assisted by his brother Bartie Brosnan.

Background
Pressured by British leaders for increased Australian participation in the war effort, Labor Prime Minister Billy Hughes announced his intention to hold a national referendum on compulsory military conscription in October 1916. After a particularly bitter campaign, a majority of Australians voted against the proposal, the issue splitting the Federal Labor Party. After joining with the conservative Opposition to form a nationalist government in February 1917, Hughes resolved to hold a second conscription referendum the following December.

The campaign was just as volatile as the first, and with the Queensland Government under Premier T.J. Ryan strongly anti-conscription, Hughes decided to tour southern Queensland in a bid to whip up support for his cause.

Warwick speech

On 29 November 1917, Hughes attempted to give a speech to the people of Warwick at the local railway station. During the speech an egg was thrown at Hughes, knocking off his hat.  Enraged, Hughes lunged into the crowd, reaching into his coat for a revolver, which had been left behind in his railway carriage. Realising his weapon was not available, Hughes ordered the local police officer, Sergeant Kenny, to arrest Brosnan for a breach of Commonwealth law but the policeman said "you have no jurisdiction".

Aftermath
This incident has been associated with the forming of the Commonwealth Police. There had been plans to create such a police force for over a decade but it is felt that this incident acted as a catalyst for it to happen.

In November 2007, the 90th anniversary of the Warwick egg-throwing incident was celebrated with a re-enactment at Warwick railway station.

See also

Conscription in Australia

References

Attribution 
 This Wikipedia article contains text from "Number 120 – Telegram from Prime Minister Hughes to the Commissioner for Police regarding being egged (later referred to as the “Warwick Egg Incident”)" published by the Queensland State Archives under CC-BY 3.0 AU licence (last updated 5 March 2012, accessed on 18 October 2015, archived on 18 October 2015).

External links
Statements, reports, telegrams and newspaper extracts concerning the Prime Minister W.M. Hughes and the egg throwing incident at Warwick Railway Station, 29 November 1917 – 6 December 1917 at Qld State Archives

History of Australia (1901–1945)
Warwick, Queensland
1917 in Australia
Protests in Australia
Military recruitment in Queensland in World War I
1917 protests